Lars Patric Karlsson (born 9 November 1967) is a retired Swedish football striker.

He started his senior career in IFK Eskilstuna, including a spell in IF Verdandi. He took a spell in IFK Luleå before trying his luck in Norway and Lillestrøm SK in 1993. He also played the autumn of 1994 in Vålerenga IF. Returning to Sweden, he got one season in IFK Norrköping and half a season in Örgryte IS before going abroad again, to Greece's Olympiacos Volou. In the spring of 1997 he went to his third Norwegian club, Tromsø IL, before finishing off in Sweden's BK Häcken and Eskilstuna City FK.

References

1967 births
Living people
Swedish footballers
IFK Eskilstuna players
IFK Luleå players
IFK Norrköping players
Örgryte IS players
BK Häcken players
Eskilstuna City FK players
Swedish expatriate footballers
Expatriate footballers in Norway
Swedish expatriate sportspeople in Norway
Lillestrøm SK players
Vålerenga Fotball players
Tromsø IL players
Allsvenskan players
Eliteserien players
Olympiacos Volos F.C. players
Expatriate footballers in Greece
Swedish expatriate sportspeople in Greece
Association football forwards